Dennis or Denis is a first or last name from the Greco-Roman name Dionysius, via one of the Christian saints named Dionysius.

The name came from Dionysus, the Greek god of ecstatic states, particularly those produced by wine, which is sometimes said to be derived from the Greek Dios (Διός, "of Zeus") and Nysos or Nysa (Νῦσα), where the young god was raised. Dionysus (or Dionysos; also known as Bacchus in Roman mythology and associated with the Italic Liber), the Thracian god of wine, represents not only the intoxicating power of wine, but also its social and beneficent influences. He is viewed as the promoter of civilization, a lawgiver, and a lover of peace—as well as the patron deity of both agriculture and the theatre.

Dionysus is a god of mystery religious rites, such as those practised in honour of Demeter and Persephone at Eleusis near Athens. In the Thracian mysteries, he wears the "bassaris" or fox-skin, symbolizing new life. (See also Maenads.)

A mediaeval Latinised form of the Anglo-Norman surname Le Denys was Dacus, which correctly meant Dacian, but when the Vikings were about was often used to mean "Danish" or "The Dane". The name became modernised as Denys, then later as Dennis.

Alternative forms and spellings of the name include Denis, Denys, Dennys, Denish, Deon, Deonne, Deonte, and Dion, Dionice. Diminutive forms include Den, Dennoh, Deno, Denny, Deny and Deen.

The name Sydenie (alternate spellings: Sydney or Sidney) may derive from a village in Normandy called Saint-Denis. A medieval diminutive was Dye, from which the names Dyson and Tyson are derived.

Dennis is a very popular English, Irish and Danish name, common throughout the English-speaking world, and a very popular French name, common throughout the Francophone world. It is also common as a  German, Italian, Dutch, Croatian, Belarusian, Ukrainian, Russian, Bulgarian, Brazilian, Bosnian, and Albanian name.

Dionizy is the Polish version of the name, while Dionigi and Dionisio are the Italian versions of the name. The Irish name Donnchadh may be anglicised as Denis, but has a different origin and is in fact related to the name Duncan. Feminine versions of the name include: Denise, Denisa, Deni, Denice, Deniece, Dione, and Dionne.

Variants 

 Dānnísī (丹尼斯): Chinese
 Dénes, Dienes, Gyenis, Gyenes: Hungarian
 Denis: Albanian, Bosnian, Bulgarian (Денис), Croatian, Czech, English, French, German, Italian, Lithuanian, Macedonian (Денис), Polish, Portuguese, Romanian, Russian (Денис), Serbo-Croatian (also Денис), Slovak, Slovene
 Deniseu (데니스): Korean
 Deniss: Latvian
 Denisu (デニス): Japanese
 Denijs: Middle Dutch
 Deniz: Turkish (actual meaning is sea)
 Dêniz: Portuguese (Brazilian)
 Dennis: Danish, Dutch, English, German, Norwegian, Swedish
 Denny: English
 Denys (Денис): Ukrainian
 Dinis, Diniz, Dionísio: Portuguese
 Dion: English, French (medieval diminutive), Greek (diminutive: Δίων)
 Dionigi: Italian
 Dionís: Catalan
 Dionise, Dionisie: Romanian
 Dionisije (Дионисије): Serbian
 Dionisio: Italian, Spanish
 Dionisos (Դիոնիսոս): Armenian
 Dionizy; Dionizjusz (archaic): Polish
 Dionysios (Διονύσιος): Greek
 Dionýz: Slovak
 Diviš: Czech
 Dzianis (Дзяніс): Belarusian
 Genis (Генис): Udmurt
 Tõnis: Estonian

People with the given name Dennis

Common combinations with given name Dennis

 Dennis Allen
 Dennis Anderson
 Dennis Avery
 Dennis Bailey
 Dennis Baker
 Dennis Bell
 Dennis Bennett
 Dennis Blair
 Dennis Boles
 Dennis Boyd
 Dennis Brown
 Dennis Brown
 Dennis Donovan
 Dennis Dougherty
 Dennis Moore
 Dennis Murphy
 Dennis Murray
 Dennis Nelson
 Dennis O'Neill
 Dennis Olsen
 Dennis Olson
 Dennis Peters
 Dennis Phillips
 Dennis Rasmussen
 Dennis Richardson
 Dennis Rivera
 Dennis Roberts
 Dennis Robertson
 Dennis Schmidt
 Dennis Scott
 Dennis Smith
 Dennis Stewart
 Dennis Sullivan
 Dennis Thompson
 Dennis Walker
 Dennis Ward
 Dennis Waterman
 Dennis White
 Dennis Williams
 Dennis Young

A-E
 Dennis Aase (1942–2023), American race car driver
 Dennis Albaugh (born 1949/50), American billionaire, founder and chairman of Albaugh LLC
 Dennis Alexio (born 1959), American kickboxer
 Dennis Aogo (born 1987), German footballer
 Dennis Barth (1951–1978), Jamaican gangster
 Dennis Bergkamp (born 1969), Dutch footballer
 Dennis Blake (born 1970), Jamaican track and field athlete
 Dennis C. Bottorff (born 1944), American business executive.
 Dennis Brain (1921–1957), English virtuoso horn player
 Dennis Brinkmann (born 1978), German footballer and manager
 Dennis Brunod (born 1978), Italian ski mountaineer and sky-runner
 Dennis Buschening (born 1991), German-Thai professional footballer
 Dennis Cagara (born 1985), Danish footballer
 Dennis Chambers (born 1959), American drummer
 Dennis Clifford (born 1992), American basketball player
 Dennis Cole (1940–2009), American actor
 Dennis Coles (born 1970), American rapper known as Ghostface Killah
 Dennis Daley (born 1996), American football player
 Dennis Danell (1961–2000), guitarist with the band Social Distortion
 Dennis Daugaard (born 1953), American politician
 Dennis Day (1942–2018), American murder victim
 Dennis Delane (died 1750), Irish actor
 Dennis DeYoung (born 1947), lead singer and keyboardist for pop music group Styx
 Dennis Diekmeier (born 1989), German footballer
 Dennis A. Dougherty (born 1952), American professor of chemistry
 Dennis Eckersley (born 1954), American baseball player
 Dennis Eilhoff (born 1982), German footballer
 Dennis Endras (born 1985), German ice hockey goaltender
 Dennis Erickson (born 1947), American football head coach

F-K
 Dennis Farina (1944–2013), American character actor
 Dennis Fentie (1950–2019), Canadian politician
 Dennis Ferrera (born 1980), Honduran footballer
 Dennis Foggia (born 2001), Italian motorcycle rider
 Dennis Franks (1953–2021), American football player 
 Dennis Franz (born 1944), American actor
 Dennis Frederiksen (1951–2014), American singer 
 Dennis Gabor (1900–1979), Hungarian electrical engineer and inventor
 Dennis Gansel (born 1973), German film director
 Dennis Gardeck (born 1994), American football player
 Dennis Gentenaar (born 1975), Dutch footballer
 Dennis Gile (born 1981), American football player
 Dennis González (1954–2022), American jazz musician, poet and visual artist
 Dennis Green (1949–2016), American football head coach
 Dennis Grote (born 1986), German footballer
 Dennis Hapugalle (1930–2000), Sri Lankan Sinhala army brigadier
 Dennis Hastert (born 1942), American politician
 Dennis Havrilla (born 1987), American football player
 Dennis Hayden (actor) (born 1952), American actor
 Dennis Haysbert (born 1954), American actor
 Dennis Hopper (1936–2010), American actor, filmmaker and artist
 Dennis Houston (born 1999), American football player
 Dennis Johnson (1954–2007), American basketball player
 Dennis Joseph (1957–2021), Malayalam scriptwriter and director
 Dennis Kipruto Kimetto (born 1984), Kenyan long-distance runner
 Dennis Kruppke (born 1980), German footballer
 Dennis Kucinich (born 1946), American politician

L-R
 Dennis Law (born 1963), Hong Kong film director
 Dennis Lennon (1918–1991), British architect and interior designer
 Dennis Lillee (born 1949), Australian cricketer
 Dennis Lisk (born 1977), German rapper known as Denyo
 Dennis Lo (born 1963), Hong Kong molecular biologist
 Dennis Lundy (born 1972), American football player
 Dennis Lynds, pseudonym of Michael Collins (American author) (1924–2005)
 Dennis Lyxzén (born 1972), Swedish musician
 Dennis Miller (born 1953), American comedian and talk show host
 Dennis Muilenburg (born 1964), American businessman, CEO of Boeing
 Dennis Nielsen (born 1947), American colonel and politician
 Dennis Nilsen (1945–2018), Scottish serial killer
 Dennis Oli (born 1984), English footballer
 Dennis Patera (born 1945), American football player
 Dennis Paul (fl. 2010s–2020s), American politician
 Dennis Prager (born 1948), American radio host
 Dennis Price (1915–1973), English actor
 Dennis Quaid (born 1954), American actor
 Dennis Rader (born 1945), American serial killer
 Dennis Ritchie (1941–2011), American computer scientist
 Dennis Rodman (born 1961), American basketball player
 Dennis Rommedahl (born 1978), Danish footballer
 Dennis Rudolph (born 1979), German conceptual artist

S-Z
 Dennis Santana (born 1996), Dominican professional baseball pitcher
 Dennis Sarfate (born 1981), American baseball player
 Dennis Schröder (born 1993), German basketball player
 Dennis Schulp (born 1978), Dutch footballer
 Dennis Seidenberg (born 1981), German ice hockey player
 Dennis Souza (born 1980), Brazilian footballer
 Dennis Stewart (basketball) (born 1947), American professional basketball player
 Dennis Stewart (judoka) (born 1960), British judoka
 Dennis Cleveland Stewart (1947–1994), American actor and dancer
 Dennis Taylor (born 1949), Northern Irish snooker player
 Dennis "Dee Tee" Thomas (1951–2021), founding member of the band Kool & the Gang
 Dennis Tito (born 1940), American engineer, multimillionaire and space tourist
 Dennis To (born 1981), Hong Kong martial artist and actor
 Dennis Trillo (born 1981), Filipino actor
 Dennis Tufano (born 1946), American singer
 Dennis Uy (born 1973), Chinese-Filipino businessman
 Dennis van der Geest (born 1975), Dutch judoka
 Dennis Waterman (1948–2022), English actor and singer
 Dennis Weaver (1924–2006), American actor
 Dennis Wheatley (1897–1977), English author
 Dennis A. Wicker (born 1952), American lawyer and politician
 Dennis Williams (born 1965), American basketball player
 Dennis Wilson (1944–1983), American musician, co-founder of The Beach Boys
 Dennis Wise (born 1966), English footballer and manager
 Dennis Zent (born 1948), American politician
 Dennis Ziadie (1946–1986), Jamaican footballer
 Dennis Ziegenhorn (born 1947), American politician
 Dennis Zine (born 1947), American politician
 Dennis Zuill (born 1978), Bermudian footballer

Fictional characters
 Dennis Creevey, minor character from Harry Potter
 Dennis Finch, main character from Just Shoot Me
 Dennis Loughran, aka Denisovich, from the 2015 animated sequel film Hotel Transylvania 2 and its two sequels Hotel Transylvania 3: Monster Vacation and Hotel Transylvania 4: Transformania is the young vampire/human hybrid son of vampire Mavis and human Johnathon.
 Dennis Nedry, character from Jurassic Park
 Dennis Reynolds, main character from It's Always Sunny in Philadelphia
 Dennis, Stanley's talking pet goldfish in the Playhouse Disney animated show Stanley
 Dennis Tanner, character on Coronation Street from its first episode in 1960 until 2014.
 Dennis the Hitman, is Plankton's bounty hunter and the secondary main villain from The SpongeBob SquarePants Movie (2004)
 Dennis the Locomotive, minor character from Thomas and Friends
 Dennis the Menace (UK comics) in The Beano
 Dennis the Menace (U.S. comics), a daily syndicated newspaper comic strip whose eponymous protagonist is named Dennis Mitchell
 Dennis the Menace (film) (released in the United Kingdom as Dennis), a 1993 live-action American family film based on the comic strip
 Dennis, character from Far Cry 3
 Dennis the Peasant, minor character from Monty Python and the Holy Grail
 Dennis Duffy, a minor character from 30 Rock
 "Phantom Dennis", Cordelia Chase's deceased roommate on Angel
 Dennis, the title character in the 2006 film Love Belongs to Everyone (released in Belgium as Dennis van Rita), played by Matthias Schoenaerts
 Dennis Lapman, character from Final Destination 5
 Dennis "Cutty" Wise, character on the HBO drama The Wire

People with the surname Dennis

A-L
 Aubrey Dennis (born 1929), South African cricketer
 Bill Dennis (born 1935), American NASCAR driver
 Bo Dennis, fictional star of Lost Girl
 C. J. Dennis (1876–1938), Australian poet
 Carl Dennis (born 1939), American poet and educator
 Carolyn Dennis (born 1954), American singer and actor
 Cathy Dennis (born 1969), English singer-songwriter, record producer and actress
 Cecil Dennis (1931–1980), Liberian political figure who served as Minister of Foreign Affairs
 Charles Dennis (born 1946), Canadian actor, playwright, director and screenwriter
 Cheri Dennis (born 1979), American singer
 Clare Dennis (1916–1971), Australian breaststroke swimmer
 David W. Dennis (1912–1999), American politician
 Derek Dennis (born 1988), American football player
 Diana Dennis (born 1951), American female bodybuilder
 Eddie Dennis (born 1986), Welsh professional wrestler
 Elias Smith Dennis (1812–1894), American lawyer, politician and soldier
 Elizabeth Salisbury Dennis (born 1943), Australian plant molecular biologist
 Emmanuel Dennis (born 1997), Nigerian football player
 Eugene Dennis (1905–1961), American politician and leader of the Communist Party USA
 Everette Dennis (fl. 2010s), American scholar
 Felix Dennis (1947–2014), English magazine publisher and philanthropist
 Ferdinand Dennis (born 1956), Jamaican-born writer, broadcaster, journalist
 Franklyn Dennis (born 1947), Canadian cricketer
 Gabriel Lafayette Dennis (1896–1954), Liberian politician
 Geoffrey Dennis (1892–1963), English writer
 George Dennis (disambiguation), several people
 Hershel Dennis (born 1984), American football player
 Hugh Dennis (born 1962), English actor, comedian, writer
 Jack Dennis (born 1931), American electrical engineer and computer scientist
 Jake Dennis (born 1995), British Formula E driver
 James Dennis (disambiguation), several people
 John Dennis (disambiguation), several people
 Kristian Dennis (born 1990), English footballer
 Lawrence Dennis (1893–1977), American diplomat, consultant and author
 Les Dennis (born 1953), English comedian and actor
 Littleton Dennis Jr. (1765–1833), associate justice of the Maryland Court of Appeals
 Littleton Purnell Dennis (1786–1834), American politician

M-Z
 Matt Dennis (1914–2002), American singer and bandleader
 Monika Larsen Dennis (born 1963), Swedish sculptor, filmmaker
 Morgan Dennis (1892–1960), American illustrator and author
 N. Dennis (1929–2013), Indian politician
 Nick Dennis (1904–1980), American actor
 Nigel Dennis (1912–1989), English writer, critic, playwright and magazine editor
 Patrick Dennis (1921–1976), American author
 Richard Dennis (born 1949), American commodities trader
 Richard William George Dennis (1910–2003), British mycologist
 Robert J. Dennis (fl. 1980s–2020s), American businessman, chairman and CEO of Genesco
 Ron Dennis (born 1947), English former executive chairman of McLaren Automotive
 Roy L. Dennis (1961–1978), American boy afflicted with craniodiaphyseal dysplasia
 Samuel Dennis (1870–1945), Australian politician
 Samuel Dennis (academic) (fl. 1770s–1790s), English academic administrator
 Samuel K. Dennis (died 1892), American politician
 Samuel K. Dennis Jr. (1874–1953), American politician and judge
 Sandy Dennis (1937–1992), American theater and film actress
 Shaun Dennis (born 1969), Scottish footballer
 Simon Dennis (disambiguation), several people
 Tom Dennis (disambiguation), several people
 Wesley Dennis (born 1963), American country music artist
 Weston Dennis (fl. 2010s–2020s), also known as Westballz, American Super Smash Bros. Melee player
 William Dennis (disambiguation)
 Willie Dennis (1926–1965), American jazz trombonist
 Willye Dennis (1926–2012), American librarian and civil rights activist

See also
 Denis (disambiguation)
 Denise (given name)
 Dionysus

External links 
 

Given names of Greek language origin
English given names
English masculine given names
Theophoric names
English-language surnames
Dionysus